Public speaking, also called oratory or oration, has traditionally meant speaking in person to a live audience. Today it includes speaking, formally or informally, to an audience through technology — live, pre-recorded, or at a distance. 

Confucius, one of many scholars associated with public speaking, once taught that if a speech was considered to be a good speech, it would impact the individuals' lives whether they listened to it directly or not. His idea was that the words and actions of someone of power can influence the world.

Public speaking is used for many different purposes, but usually as some mixture of teaching, persuasion, or entertaining. Each of these calls upon slightly different approaches and techniques. 

Public speaking was developed as a primary sphere of knowledge in Greece and Rome, where prominent thinkers codified it as a central part of rhetoric. Today, the art of public speaking has been transformed by newly available technology such as videoconferencing, multimedia presentations, and other non-traditional forms.

Purpose of public speaking 
The function of public speaking is determined by the speaker's intent when addressing a particular audience. It is possible for the same speaker, with the same intent, to deliver substantially different speeches to two different audiences. The main objective is to evoke a change in the audience, whether in their hearts, minds, or actions.

Although the name suggests otherwise, public speaking is often delivered to a closed, limited audience who share a common outlook. This audience can be composed of fervent supporters of the speaker, antagonistic individuals attending the event unwillingly or out of spite, or strangers with no particular interest in the speaker. However, effective speakers understand that even a small audience is not a homogeneous mass with a single point of view but rather a collection of diverse individuals.

Broadly speaking, public speaking aims either to reassure an anxious audience or to alert a complacent audience to something important. Once the speaker has determined which of these approaches is required, they will use a combination of storytelling and information delivery to achieve their goals.

Persuasion 
Persuasion is a term derived from the Latin word "persuādēre." The aim of persuasive speaking is to change the audience's beliefs. Persuasive speaking is evident in political debates where leaders attempt to persuade their audience, whether the general public or government officials.

Persuasive speaking involves four essential elements: the persuader, the audience, the speaking method, and the message the speaker is trying to convey. When attempting to persuade an audience, a speaker appeals to their emotions and beliefs to change their opinions.

Various techniques are available for speakers to gain audience support. Demanding action from the audience, using inclusive language ("we" and "us") to create a sense of unity between the speaker and audience, and selecting words with strong connotations to intensify the message's impact are among the most important techniques. Rhetorical questions, anecdotes, generalizations, exaggerations, metaphors, and irony are among the other methods that a speaker may employ to increase the chances of persuading an audience.

Education 
Public speaking can serve as a means of transferring knowledge to an audience. One example of educational public speaking is the TED Talks, where speakers inform their listeners about a range of topics, such as science, physics, biology, technology, religion, economics, human society, astronomy, animal studies, psychology, and more. In addition to sharing their expertise, TED speakers may also use their platform to discuss personal experiences with traumatic events, such as abuse, bullying, grief, assault, suicidal ideation, near-death experiences, mental illness, and to raise awareness and acceptance for various stigmatized issues, including disabilities, facial differences, LGBT rights, children's rights, and women's rights.

Intervention 
The intervention style of speaking is a relatively new method proposed by a rhetorical theorist named William R. Brown. This style revolves around the fact that humans create a symbolic meaning for life and the things around them. Due to this, the symbolic meaning of everything changes based on the way one communicates. When approaching communication with an intervention style, communication is understood to be responsible for the constant changes in the society, behaviors, and how one considers the meaning behind objects, ideologies, and every day life.

From an interventional perspective, when individuals communicate, they are intervening with what is already reality and might "shift symbolic reality." This approach to communication also encompasses the possibility or idea that one may be responsible for unexpected outcomes due to what and how one communicates. This perspective also widens the scope of focus from a single speaker who is intervening to a multitude of speakers all communicating and intervening, simultaneously affecting the world around us.

History

Greece

Although there is evidence of public speech training in ancient Egypt, the first known piece on oratory, written over 2,000 years ago, came from ancient Greece. This work elaborated on principles drawn from the practices and experiences of ancient Greek orators.

Aristotle was one who first recorded the teachers of oratory to use definitive rules and models. One of his key insights was that speakers always combine, to varying degrees, three things:  reasoning, credentials, and emotion, which he called Logos, Ethos, and Pathos. Aristotle's work became an essential part of a liberal arts education during the Middle Ages and the Renaissance. The classical antiquity works written by the ancient Greeks capture the ways they taught and developed the art of public speaking thousands of years ago.

In classical Greece and Rome, rhetoric was the main component of composition and speech delivery, both of which were critical skills for citizens to use in public and private life. In ancient Greece, citizens spoke on their own behalf rather than having professionals, like modern lawyers, speak for them. Any citizen who wished to succeed in court, in politics, or in social life had to learn techniques of public speaking. Rhetorical tools were first taught by a group of rhetoric teachers called Sophists who were notable for teaching paying students how to speak effectively using the methods they developed.

Separately from the Sophists, Socrates, Plato, and Aristotle developed their own theories of public speaking and taught these principles to students who wanted to learn skills in rhetoric. Plato and Aristotle taught these principles in schools that they founded, The Academy and The Lyceum, respectively. Although Greece eventually lost political sovereignty, the Greek culture of training in public speaking was adopted almost identically by the Romans.

Demosthenes was a well-known orator from Athens. After his father died when he was 7, he had three legal guardians which were Aphobus, Demophon, and Theryppides. His inspiration for public speaking came after he learned that his guardians had robbed his father's money left for his education. He was first exposed to public speaking when his suit required him to speak in front of the court. Demosthenes started practicing public speaking more after that and is known for sticking pebbles into his mouth in order to help his pronunciation, talk while running so that he wouldn't lose his breath while speaking, and practice talking in front of a mirror to improve his delivery. When Philip II, the ruler of Macedon, tried to conquer the Greeks, Demosthenes made a speech called Kata Philippou A. In this speech, he spoke to the rest of the Greeks about why he opposed Philip II and why the ruler was a threat to them. This speech was one of the first speeches that were known as the Philippics. He had other speeches known as the Olynthiacs and these speeches along with the Philippics were used to get the people in Athens to rally against Philip II. Demosthenes was known for being in favor of independence.

Rome

In the political rise of the Roman Republic, Roman orators copied and modified the ancient Greek techniques of public speaking. Instruction in rhetoric developed into a full curriculum, including instruction in grammar (study of the poets), preliminary exercises (progymnasmata), and preparation of public speeches (declamation) in both forensic and deliberative genres.

The Latin style of rhetoric was heavily influenced by Cicero and involved a strong emphasis on a broad education in all areas of humanistic study in the liberal arts, including philosophy. Other areas of study included the use of wit and humor, the appeal to the listener's emotions, and the use of digressions. Oratory in the Roman empire, though less central to political life than in the days of the Republic, remained significant in law and became a big form of entertainment. Famous orators became celebrities in ancient Rome—very wealthy and prominent members of society.

The Latin style was the primary form of oration until the beginning of the 20th century. After World War II, however, the Latin style of oration began to gradually grow out of style as the trend of ornate speaking was seen as impractical. This cultural change likely had to do with the rise of the scientific method and the emphasis on a "plain" style of speaking and writing. Even formal oratory is much less ornate today than it was in the Classical Era.

China 
Ancient China had a delayed start to the implementation of Rhetoric (persuasion) as China did not have rhetoricians teaching rhetoric to its people. It was understood that Chinese rhetoric was already within Chinese philosophy. However, ancient China did have philosophical schools that focused on two concepts: "‘Wen’ (rhetoric) and ‘Zhi’ (thoughtful content)." Ancient Chinese rhetoric shows strong connections with modern-day teachings of public speaking because of ethics being of high value in Chinese rhetoric.

Ancient Chinese rhetoric had three meanings: modifying language use to reflect people’s feelings; modifying language use to be more punctual, effective, and impactful; and rhetoric being used as an "aesthetic tool." Traditionally, Chinese rhetoric focused primarily on written language via-à-vis spoken, but written language and spoken language share similar constructional characteristics.

The unique and key difference between Chinese rhetoric and the rhetoric of western cultures can be found in the type of audience being persuaded. In western rhetoric, a public audience is typically the target for persuasion, whereas state rulers were the focus for persuasion in Chinese rhetoric. Another difference between Chinese and Western rhetoric practices is how a speaker establishes credibility or Ethos. The ethical appeal in Chinese rhetoric is not solely focused on the speaker itself, as seen with the western implementation of credibility, but more in the way that the speaker connects to the audience with collectivism. A speaker can accomplish this by sharing personal experiences and establishing a connection between a speaker's concern and public interest.

When analyzing public speakers, the Chinese approach to rhetoric indicates that an audience should identify three standards: tracing, examination, and practice. Establishing the tracing of a speaker can be described as how well the speaker is speaking according to traditional practices of speech. Examination refers to the consideration of civilian's daily lives. Practice is found in the topic or argument itself and that it is relevant and benefits the "state, society, and people."

Theorists

Aristotle 
Aristotle and one of his most famous writings, "Rhetoric" (written in 350 B.C.E), have been used as a foundation for learning how to master the arts of public speaking. In his works, rhetoric is the act of publicly persuading the audience. Rhetoric is similar to dialect, he defines both as being acts of persuasion. However, dialect is the act of persuading someone in private, whereas rhetoric is about persuading people in a public setting. More specifically, Aristotle defines someone who practices rhetoric or a "rhetorician" as an individual who is able to interpret and understand what persuasion is and how it is applied.

Aristotle breaks up the making of the practice of rhetoric into three categories, the categories being the elements of a speech: the speaker, the topic or point of the speech, and the audience. Aristotle also includes three types of oratory or respects: politics, forensic, and ceremonial. The political oratory is used when the intent is to convince someone or a body of people to do something or not. In the forensic approach, someone is the center of attention for them to be accused or defended. Lastly, with the ceremonial approach, someone is being recognized for their actions in either a positive or negative way.

Aristotle breaks down the political category into five focus or themes: "ways and means, war and peace, national defense, imports and exports, and legislation." These focuses are broken down into detail so that a speaker can focus on what is needed to take into consideration so that the speaker can effectively influence an audience to agree and support the speaker's ideas. The focus of "ways and means" deals with economic aspects in how the country is spending money. "Peace and War" focus on what the country has to offer in terms of military power, how war has been conducted, how war has affected the country in the past, and how other countries have conducted war. "National defense" deals with taking into consideration the position and strength of a country in the event of an invasion. Forces, fortifying structures, points with a strategic advantage should all be considered. "Food supply" is concerned with the ability to support a country in regards to food, importing and exporting food, and carefully making decisions to arrange agreements with other countries. Lastly, Aristotle breaks down the "legislation" theme, and this theme seems to be the most important to Aristotle. The legislation of a country is the most crucial aspect of all the above because everything is affected by the policies and laws set by the people in power.

In Aristotle's "Rhetoric" writing, he mentions three strategies someone can use to try to persuade an audience: Establishing the character of a speaker (Ethos), influencing the emotional element of the audience (Pathos), and focusing on the argument specifically (Logos). Aristotle believes establishing the character of a speaker is effective in persuasion because the audience will believe what the speaker is saying to be true if the speaker is credible and trustworthy. With the audience's emotional state, Aristotle believes that individuals do not make the same decisions when in different moods. Because of this, one needs to try to influence the audience by being in control of one's emotions, making persuasion effective. The argument itself can affect the attempt to persuade by making the argument of the case so clear and valid that the audience will understand and believe that the speaker's point is real.

In the last part of "Rhetoric", Aristotle mentions that the most critical piece of persuasion is to know in detail what makes up government and to attack what makes it unique: "customs, institutions, and interest". Aristotle also states that everyone is persuaded by considering people's interests and how the society in which they live influences their interests.

Historical speeches

Despite the shift in style, the best-known examples of strong public speaking are still studied years after their delivery. Among these examples are:
Pericles' Funeral Oration in 427 BC addressing those who died during the Peloponnesian War
Abraham Lincoln's Gettysburg Address in 1863
Sojourner Truth's identification of racial issues in "Ain't I a Woman?"
Martin Luther King, Jr.'s "I Have a Dream" speech at the Washington Monument in 1963.

As in other parts of general culture, the notion of a canon of the most important historical speeches is giving way to a broader understanding. Many previously forgotten historical speeches are being recovered and studied.

Women and public speaking

There are many international female speakers. Much of women's earlier public speaking is directly correlated to activism work.

United States 
Between the 18th and 19th century in the United States, women were publicly banned from speaking in the courtroom, the senate floor, and the pulpit. It was also deemed improper for a woman to be heard in a public setting. Exceptions existed for women from the Quaker religion, allowing them speak publicly in meetings of the church.

Frances Wright was one of the first female public speakers of the United States, advocating equal education for both women and men through large audiences and the press. Maria Stewart, a woman of African American descent, was also one of the first female speakers of the United States, lecturing in Boston in front of both men and women just 4 years after Wright, in 1832 and 1833, on educational opportunities and abolition for young girls.

The first female agents, and sisters, of the American Anti-Slavery Society, Angelina Grimké and Sarah Grimké created a platform for public lectures to women, and conducted tours between 1837 and 1839. The sisters advocated that slavery relates to women's rights, and that women need equality. Subsequently they came to a disagreement with churches which did not want the two speaking publicly, due to them being women.

Great Britain 
The British political activist, Emmeline Pankhurst, founded the Women's Social and Political Union (WSPU) on October 10, 1903. The organization was aimed towards fighting for a woman's right for parliamentary vote, which only men were granted for at the time. Emmeline was known for being a powerful orator, who led many women to rebel through militant forms until the outbreak of World War I in 1914.

Pakistan 
Malala Yousafzai is a modern-day public speaker, who was born in the Swat Valley in Pakistan, and is an educational activist for women and girls. After the Taliban restricted the educational rights of women in the Swat Valley, Yousafzai presented her first speech How Dare the Taliban Take Away My Basic Right to Education?, in which she protested the shutdowns of the schools. She presented this speech to a press in Peshawar. Through this, she was able to bring more awareness to the situation in Pakistan. She is known for her "inspiring and passionate speech" about educational rights given at the United Nations. She is the youngest person ever to receive the Nobel Peace Prize, at the age of 17, which was awarded to her in 2014. Her public speaking has brought worldwide attention to the difficulties of young girls in Pakistan. She continues to advocate for educational rights for women and girls worldwide through the Malala Fund, with the purpose of helping girls around the world receive 12 years of education.

Japan 
Kishida Toshiko (1861–1901) was a female speaker during the Japanese Meiji Period. In October 1883, she publicly delivered a speech entitled 'Hakoiri Musume' (Daughters Kept in Boxes) in front of approximately 600 people. Performed in Yotsu no Miya Theater in Kyoto, she criticised the action of parents that shelter their daughters from the outside world. Despite her prompt arrest, Kishida demonstrates the ability for Japanese women to evoke women's issues, experience, and liberation in public spaces, through the use of public speaking.

Glossophobia

The fear of speaking in public, known as glossophobia or public speaking anxiety, is often mentioned as one of the most common phobias.

The reason is uncertain, but it has been speculated that this fear is primal, like how animals fear being seen by predators.

However, the apprehension experienced when speaking in public can have a number of causes, such as social anxiety disorder, or a prior experience of public humiliation.

Training

Effective public speaking can be developed by joining a club such as Rostrum, Toastmasters International, Association of Speakers Clubs (ASC), or Speaking Circles, in which members are assigned exercises to improve their speaking skills. Members learn by observation and practice, and hone their skills by listening to constructive suggestions, followed by new public speaking exercises.

Toastmasters International 
Toastmasters International is a public speaking organization with over 15,000 clubs worldwide, and more than 300,000 members. This organization helps individuals with their public speaking skills, as well as other skills necessary for them to grow and become effective public speakers. Members of the club meet and work together on their skills; each member practices giving speeches, while the other members evaluate and provide feedback. There are also other small tasks that the members do, like practice impromptu speaking by talking about different topics without having anything planned. Each member has a specific role, and all of these roles help with the process of gaining their skills as public speakers, and as leaders. The number of roles lets each member be able to speak at least one time at the meetings. Members are also able to participate in a variety of speech contests, in which the winners can compete in the World Championship of Public Speaking.

Rostrum 
Rostrum is another public speaking organization, founded in Australia, with more than 100 clubs all over the country. This organization aims at helping people become better communicators, no matter the occasion. At the meetings, speakers are able to gain skills by presenting speeches, while members provide feedback to those presenting. Qualified speaking trainers attend these meetings as well, and provide professional feedback at the end of the meetings. There are also competitions that are held for members to participate in. An online club is also available for members, no matter where they live.

The new millennium has seen a notable increase in the number of training solutions, offered in the form of video and online courses. Videos can provide simulated examples of behaviors to emulate. Professional public speakers often engage in ongoing training and education to refine their craft. This may include seeking guidance to improve their speaking skills, such as learning better storytelling techniques, learning how to effectively use humor as a communication tool, and continuously researching in their topic area of focus.

Professional speakers

Public speaking for business and commercial events is often done by professionals, whose expertise is well established. These speakers can be contracted independently, through representation by a speakers bureau, or by other means. Public speaking plays a large role in the professional world. In fact, it is believed that 70 percent of all jobs involve some form of public speaking.

Modern

Technology

New technology has also opened different forms of public speaking that are non-traditional such as TED Talks, which are conferences that are broadcast globally. This form of public speaking has created a wider audience base because public speaking can now reach both physical and virtual audiences. These audiences can be watching from all around the world. YouTube is another platform that allows public speaking to reach a larger audience. On YouTube, people can post videos of themselves. Audiences are able to watch these videos for all types of purposes.

Multimedia presentations can contain different video clips, sound effects, animation, laser pointers, remote control clickers, and endless bullet points.  All adding to the presentation and evolving our traditional views of public speaking.

Public speakers may use audience response systems. For large assemblies, the speaker will usually speak with the aid of a public address system or microphone and loudspeaker.

These new forms of public speaking, which can be considered non-traditional, have opened up debates about whether these forms of public speaking are actually public speaking. Many people consider YouTube broadcasting to not be a true form of public speaking because there is not a real and physical audience.

Telecommunication
Telecommunication and videoconferencing are also forms of public speaking. David M. Fetterman of Stanford University wrote in his 1997 article Videoconferencing over the Internet: "Videoconferencing technology allows geographically disparate parties to hear and see each other usually through satellite or telephone communication systems." This technology is helpful for large conference meetings and face-to-face communication between parties without demanding the inconvenience of travel.

Notable modern theorists
Harold Lasswell developed Lasswell's model of communication. There are five basic elements of public speaking that are described in this theory: the communicator, message, medium, audience, and effect. In short, the speaker should be answering the question "who says what in which channel to whom with what effect?"

See also 

 Audience response
 Crowd manipulation
 Debate
 Eloquence
 Eulogy
 Glossophobia
 List of speeches
 Public orator
 Persuasion 
 Rhetoric
 Speechwriter
 Speakers' bureau
 Thematic interpretation
 Toastmasters International
 :Category:Speeches by type

References

Further reading
 Collins, Philip. "The Art of Speeches and Presentations" (John Wiley & Sons, 2012).
 Fairlie, Henry.  "Oratory in Political Life," History Today (Jan 1960) 10#1 pp 3–13. A survey of political oratory in Great Britain from 1730 to 1960.
 Flintoff, John-Paul. "A Modest Book About How To Make An Adequate Speech" (Short Books, 2021). excerpt
 Gold, David, and Catherine L. Hobbs, eds. Rhetoric, History, and Women's Oratorical Education: American Women Learn to Speak (Routledge, 2013).
 Heinrichs, Jay. "Thank You For Arguing" (Penguin, 2008).
 Lucas, Stephen E. The Art of Public Speaking (13th ed. McGraw Hill, 2019).
 Noonan, Peggy. "Simply Speaking" (Regan Books, 1998).
 Parry-Giles, Shawn J., and J. Michael Hogan, eds. The Handbook of Rhetoric and Public Address (2010)  excerpt
 Sproule, J. Michael. "Inventing public speaking: Rhetoric and the speech book, 1730–1930." Rhetoric & Public Affairs 15.4 (2012): 563–608. excerpt
 Turner, Kathleen J., Randall Osborn, et al. Public speaking (11th ed. Houghton Mifflin, 2017). excerpt
 Dale Carnegie· Arthur R. Pell. Public Speaking for Success. 2006 
 Dale Carnegie. Public Speaking and Influencing Men in Business. 2003
 Dale Carnegie. How to Develop Self-Confidence &  nfluence People by Public Speaking. New York: Pocket Books,1926
 Chris Anderson. The Official TED Guide to Public Speaking. Houghton Mifflin Harcourt, Boston, 2016.

External links 

 
 How to speak so that people want to listen

 
Rhetoric
Politics
Political science
Performing arts